Thomas Bretnor (fl. 1607-1618), was an almanac maker.

Bretnor calls himself on the title-page of one of his almanacs "", and on that of another, "professor of the mathematicks and student in physicke in Cow Lane, London".

Bretnor was a notorious character in London, and is noticed by Ben Jonson in his Devil is an Ass (1616), i. 2, and by Thomas Middleton in his Fair Quarrel (1617), vi.

Works
His extant works are as follows:
A Prognostication for this Present Yeere … M.DC.VII. … Imprinted at London for the Companie of Stationers (a copy is in the British Museum). Necessary observations in Phlebotomie and Advertisements in Husbandrie are introduced into the work.
A Newe Almanacke and Prognostication for … 1615 (copies are in the Huth Library and the Bodleian).
Opiologia, or a Treatise concerning the nature, properties, true preparation, and safe vse and administration of Opium. By Angelus Sala Vincentines Venatis, and done into English and something enlarged by Tho. Bretnor, M.M., London, 1618. This translation, which is made from the French, is dedicated "to the learned and my worthily respected friends D. Bonham and Maister Nicholas Carter, physitians". In an address to the reader Bretnor defends the use of laudanum in medicine, promises to prepare for his readers "", and mentions his friends "Herbert Whitfield in Newgate Market" and "Maister Bromhall" as good druggists.

References

Year of birth missing
17th-century deaths
17th-century English writers
17th-century English male writers